The Keystone Pipeline oil spill occurred on December 7, 2022, when a leak in the Keystone Pipeline released 14,000 barrels of oil into a creek in Washington County, Kansas. The leak is the largest in the United States since the 2013 North Dakota pipeline spill and the largest in the history of the Keystone Pipeline.

Background

The Keystone Pipeline System spans from the Western Canadian Sedimentary Basin in Alberta to refineries in Texas. The oil pipeline is owned by TC Energy and the Government of Alberta. Pipelines in the Keystone Pipeline System go through stress tests prior to use.

Detection and response
At 9:00 p.m. EDT on December 7, TC Energy launched an emergency shutdown of the Keystone Pipeline, following a drop in pressure. The Environmental Protection Agency built an earthen dam to contain the spill. The leak was detected near Washington County, Kansas, and spilled into Mill Creek, a creek that flows directly into the Little Blue River (Kansas/Nebraska). An evacuation order was not ordered.

Environmental impact
The leak raised concerns from environmentalists due to the transfer of tar sands through the pipeline, which are more toxic than crude oil and can sink in water.

Pipeline investigation
The Pipeline and Hazardous Materials Safety Administration began an investigation into the leak. The Environmental Protection Agency dispatched two coordinators, who determined there was no impact to drinking water in the Washington County area.

Economic impact
The price of crude oil rose 5% following the shutdown of the Keystone Pipeline, before receding. The surge occurred during a selloff of the price of oil, following the 2021–2022 global energy crisis. TC Energy declared a force majeure upon news of the leak.

References

Oil spills in the United States
December 2022 events in the United States
2022 in Kansas